The Rural Municipality of Swift Current No. 137 is a rural municipality (RM) in the Canadian province of Saskatchewan within  Division No. 3. Located in the southwest portion of the office, it surrounds the City of Swift Current.

History 
The RM of Swift Current No. 137 incorporated as a rural municipality on December 12, 1910.

Geography

Communities and localities 
The following urban municipalities are surrounded by the RM.

Cities
Swift Current

The following unincorporated communities are within the RM.

Organized hamlets
Wymark

Localities
Aikins
Beverley
Cantuar
Duncairn
Dunelm
Hak
Java
Player
Pondarosa Trailer Court
Rhineland
Rosengart
Schantzenfel
Schoenfeld
Schoenwiese
Smith Field Airport
Springfeld
Swift Current Airport
Wyatt

Demographics 

Government 
The RM of Swift Current No. 137 is governed by an elected municipal council and an appointed administrator that meets on the second Tuesday of every month. The reeve of the RM is Robert Neufeld while its administrator is Linda Boser. The RM's office is located in Swift Current.

References

External links 

Swift Current
Swift Current No. 137, Saskatchewan
Division No. 8, Saskatchewan